The Kyiv Marathon or Wizz Air Kyiv City Marathon is an annual road running event over the marathon distance which is held in October on the streets of Kyiv, Ukraine since 2010.

History
In 2010 Kyiv joined the list of cities that hold their own annual marathon. October 16, 2010 Kyiv held its first marathon, attended by 546 participants from 13 countries – 144 athletes volunteered to go to the start of the classic marathon, which is 42 km 195 m. Volodymyr Horban from Kyiv and Liudmyla Shelest from Sumy became the winners.

The second marathon in 2011 was attended by more than 1,000 runners. 1,693 participants registered in 2013, and in the spring of 2014, nearly 3,500 athletes from 32 countries started. In 2015 3,800 participants from 38 countries came to the starting line. The marathon route became the special feature of this race since it was mapped as one lap through the city. More than 6600 athletes and amateurs from 50 countries started in 2016.

In 2017, a man died from participating in the event.

The 2020 in-person edition of the race was canceled due to the coronavirus pandemic, with all registrants given the option of transferring their entry to 2021 or 2022, or receiving credit of equivalent value for other races.

On , a week after Russia invaded Ukraine with help from Belarus, Run Ukraine banned Russian and Belarusian runners from all its events, and stated that the runners' registration fees would be used to restore Ukraine.  On , about five months into the invasion, Run Ukraine announced that the marathon was postponed indefinitely.

Course 

Runners then head southeast to the Olimpiyskiy National Sports Complex and then north up Khreshchatyk Street to Maidan Nezalezhnosti.

Runners then run northwest along the Dnipro River and cross the pedestrian  into Trukhaniv Island.  The course runs northward through the greenery, and then leaves the island via Pivnichnyi Bridge.  The marathon then runs along the Dnipro through Rybalskyi Peninsula via  before crossing the Harbour Bridge.  Runners then run through the Podil neighbourhood and climb up  and  before returning to Volodymyrs'kyi Passage for the finish.

Winners 

Key: Course record

Marathon

Half marathon

10 km

Notes

References

External links 
 

Marathons in Europe
Marathons in Ukraine
Sports competitions in Kyiv
Recurring sporting events established in 2010
Athletics competitions in Ukraine
2010 establishments in Ukraine
Athletics in Kyiv